Varanus scalaris is a small species of monitor lizard. It is often referred to as the banded tree monitor or the spotted tree monitor.

It is found in Australia in the states of Western Australia and Queensland as well as the Northern Territory, the province of Papua, Indonesia and in Papua New Guinea.

The species inhabits trees in the savanna woodlands and forages for food in both trees and on the ground, with a diet consisting of insects as well as small vertebrates.

References

Varanus
Lizards of Asia
Monitor lizards of Australia
Reptiles of Papua New Guinea
Reptiles of Indonesia
Reptiles of Queensland
Reptiles of Western Australia
Reptiles of the Northern Territory
Reptiles described in 1941
Taxa named by Robert Mertens